This is a list of seasons by the San Miguel Beermen of the Philippine Basketball Association.

Three-conference era

Two-conference era

one-game playoffs**team had twice-to-beat advantage

Three-conference era

*one-game playoffs**team had the twice-to-beat advantage

Cumulative records